Foley High School is in Foley, Alabama and is part of the Baldwin County Public Schools System. Foley High School has its own American football, archery, cross-country, baseball, cheerleading, women's/men's soccer, softball, and women's/men's basketball teams. Along with this, there are also men's/women's track, men's/women's golf, men's/women's tennis, men's/women's wrestling , men's swim team, and volleyball teams. The school is well known for its marching and concert band, "The Mighty Band from Lion Land," which has won a Grammy. The band has been winning superior ratings at competitions in the United States since the 1970s and has performed at the Saint Patrick's Day Parade in Chicago, the Daytona 500 race, the Fiesta Bowl parade, and many more places over its long history.

Alumni
Justin Anderson (American Football), former Linebacker of the Louisiana–Lafayette Ragin' Cajuns and currently a free agent in the NFL.
D. J. Fluker (American Football), former Offensive Tackle of the Alabama Crimson Tide and current Offensive Tackle for the Baltimore Ravens
Braxton Garrett, first round pick in the 2016 MLB Draft by the Miami Marlins
Julio Jones (American Football), former Wide Receiver of the Alabama Crimson Tide and current Wide Receiver for the Tampa Bay Buccaneers
Robert Lester (American Football), former Safety of the Alabama Crimson Tide and currently a free agent in the NFL.
Ken Stabler (American Football), former football quarterback for the Oakland Raiders (1970–1979), the Houston Oilers (1980–1981), and the New Orleans Saints (1982–1984). Pro Football Hall of Fame Class of 2016.

References

External links
School website

Public high schools in Alabama
Schools in Baldwin County, Alabama